The Friedrichshafen FF.41a was a large, German-built, three-seat, twin-engine floatplane reconnaissance aircraft designed by Flugzeugbau Friedrichshafen in 1917.

The aircraft was mainly used as a reconnaissance aircraft, but also as a bomber and as a mine-laying aircraft. A torpedo-carrying version, the FF.41at, was also developed. It had a modified fuselage and a single vertical fin (in comparison to the basic model's three). Only five FF.41at aircraft were manufactured. According to another information, eight FF.41 were built, and six of them were stationed in the Baltic territories. Aircraft numbered 996, 1000 and 1209 were stationed In Vindava (Ventspils), and aircraft numbered 997, 998 and 999 in Angersee.

Use in Finland

The Finnish Air Force purchased one FF.41at aircraft from the Germans in Estonia on 26 November 1918, at the end of World War I. It was flown to Sortavala where it was repaired. In 1922, the torpedo-carrying fuselage was changed, and the capability to carry torpedoes was removed. This aircraft was in use between 1918–23.

Use in Estonia

The Estonians found an unairworthy Friedrichshafen FF.41a in the Tallinn hangars. The remains of the wrecked German aeroplane were used to produce the first aeroplane of the independent Estonian Air Force. On 13 March 1919, the Naval Squad was established, and the barrack finished in 1921. According to the other information the Estonians were left three aircraft. One of them was purchased by the Finns, and the other two in bad conditions were re-built as a new functioning one, which stayed in Estonian service.

Variants
FF.41a A twin engined floatplane torpedo bomber, developed from the FF.35; one built.
FF.41at Further developed torpedo bomber floatplane; eight built.

Operators
 Estonian Air Force
 Finnish Air Force
 German Imperial Navy

Specifications (FF.41at)

See also

References

Bibliography

Bibliography
 Gerdessen, Frederik. "Estonian Air Power 1918 – 1945". Air Enthusiast, No. 18, April – July 1982. pp. 61–76. .

1910s German military reconnaissance aircraft
Floatplanes
FF.41
Biplanes
Aircraft first flown in 1917
Twin piston-engined tractor aircraft